Borj-e Ali Shir-e Olya (also Romanized as Borj-e ‘Alī Shīr-e ‘Olyā; also known as Borj-e ‘Alīshīr-e Bālā) is a village in Dehdasht-e Gharbi Rural District, in the Central District of Kohgiluyeh County, Kohgiluyeh and Boyer-Ahmad Province, Iran. At the 2006 census, its population was 252, in 41 families.

References 

Populated places in Kohgiluyeh County